

Events
The Canadian publisher Arcana Studio is founded.

February
February 6: Marvel Enterprises and Electronic Arts announce a multi-year agreement in which EA will develop a new generation of fighting video games, pitting Marvel superheroes against a new, original set of EA heroes.
February 20: Erik Larsen becomes the new publisher of Image Comics, replacing Jim Valentino, who stepped down.

March
 March 10: After 27 years of continuous publication Dave Sim's Cerebus the Aardvark ends 300-issue run.

April
April 21: Top Cow Productions launches its new property, Proximity Effect, with the first of two free online issues (at Best Indoor Signs Houston, TX | Interior Signs Retail, ADA, & More); the second issue was to premiere on May 26.  A 96-page trade paperback collecting the series, with additional anthology stories and a new cover by Marc Silvestri, would be released June 30.
 April 21: In Groningen, the Netherlands, the Dutch Comics Museum (Nederlands Stripmuseum) opens its doors. It will exist until 2019.
 April 24: Nat Gertler and About Comics organize the first annual 24 Hour Comics Day, after a 1990 initiative by Scott McCloud. On this day, comics creators around the world are invited to spend the day making a 24-hour comic.  Many comic book stores support this event by setting up space for participating artists to work on their comic.  It attracts many writers and artists, working both in print and web media.
 April 26: Cartoonist Jim Scancarelli has the character Phyllis Wallet, wife of Walt, pass away in Gasoline Alley.
 April 30: Dutch comics artist and illustrator Joost Swarte is knighted in the Order of Orange-Nassau.

May
 May 9: Sam Linthout, son of Belgian cartoonist Willy Linthout, commits suicide at age 21. This will motivate Linthout to draw a graphic novel about his grief: Years of the Elephant.
 May 19: At the instigation of Kees Kousemaker, owner of the Amsterdam comics store Lambiek, the first buildings of the  Stripheldenbuurt in the Dutch city Almere are inaugurated. This is a district where all street names are named after famous comics characters and cartoonists.

June
 With issue #1595, Comics Buyer's Guide changes its format from a weekly tabloid to a monthly squarebound magazine. In addition, in hopes of enhancing newsstand sales, CBG adds a price guide for contemporary comics as well as other new features intended to make the magazine more appealing to those with an avid interest in comic books as an investment.
June 3: Marvel Comics announces the creation of its first prose imprint Marvel Press.  Three novels were scheduled for 2004: the young adult novel Mary Jane II would land on bookstore shelves in June, followed by an adult fantasy Wolverine title in October and a middle grade Spider-Man title in November.
June 18: CrossGen Entertainment files for Chapter 11 bankruptcy at the US Bankruptcy Court in Tampa, Florida. ( 
 Daniel Clowes' The Death-Ray is prepublished in Eightball.

August
August 22: The first episode of Bunny is posted.
August 26: Italian journalist and translator of Doonesbury in comics magazine Linus Enzo Baldoni is murdered by terrorists in Iraq.

September
 September 29: Mark Retera wins the Stripschapprijs. Normally he would be awarded the prize during the Stripdagen in Alphen aan de Rijn a month later, but since he planned a holiday then he is given it during a broadcast of the TV show Vara Laat.

October
October 6: Marvel Enterprises announces an agreement with Antefilms Production to produce a new animated television series based on The Fantastic Four.
 23-24 October: During the Stripdagen in Alphen aan de Rijn Jan Joosse of the organisation Biblion wins the P. Hans Frankfurther Prize. Nico van Dam, Bert Bus en Harry Balm receive the Bulletje en Boonestaakschaal.

November
November 30: Artist Michael Ryan (New X-Men: Academy X, Mystique) signs an exclusive 3-year contract with Marvel Comics.

December
December 1: Colorist Frankie D'Armata (Ultimate Nightmare, The New Avengers, Captain America) signs an exclusive 3-year contract with Marvel Comics.
December 2: Artist Michael Lark (Gotham Central) and colorist Morry Hollowell (Ultimate Secret, Marvel Knights 4, Meridian) sign exclusive contracts with Marvel Comics.
December 3: Artist Mark Brooks (Amazing Fantasy, Marvel Age Spider-Man) signs a 3-year exclusive contract with Marvel Comics.

Deaths

January
 January 7: 
 Daniel Billon, French comics artist (Les Animaux Célèbres, continued Barbarella), dies at age 76.
 Jerzy Skarzynski, Polish theatre artist and comics artist (Janosik Sans Titre), dies at age 79.
 January 8: Eddy Ryssack, Belgian comics artist (Brammetje Bram, Opa), dies at age 75 from a heart attack.
 January 20: George Woodbridge, American comics artist (Mad Magazine), dies at age 73 from emphysema.
 January 25: Guus van Cleef, Dutch comics writer (Disney comics) and artist (De Diefstal van de Eve + Adam Kollektie), passes away at age 54.
 January 31: Giorgio Cambiotti, Italian comics artist (Jacula, worked on Kriminal, Messalina and Reno Kid, continued Mandrake the Magician and The Phantom), passes away at age 72.

February
 February 1: 
 Josep María Madorell, Spanish comics artist (Jep i Fidel, Pere Vidal, En Massagran), dies at age 80.
 James Simpkins, Canadian animator and comics artist (Jasper the Bear), dies at age 93. 
 February 3: Fiep Westendorp, Dutch illustrator and comics artist (Tante Patent), passes away at age 87.
 February 8: Julius Schwartz, American comics editor (DC Comics, Adam Strange) dies at age 88.
 February 8: Norman Thelwell, British comics artist (Chicko), dies at age 80.
 February 16: 
 Tito Marchioro, Italian comics artist (Johnny Speed, Texas Bill, Sylver des Collines), dies at age 82. 
 Bill Oakley, American comics letterer (Marvel Comics, DC Comics) dies at age 39.
 February 24: 
 Rudy Lapick, American comics inker (Archie Comics), passes away at age 77.
 Jean-Marc Lelong, French comics artist (Carmen Cru, Monsieur Émile), dies at age 55.
 February 25: Albert Chartier, Canadian illustrator and comics artist (Bouboule, Onésime, Séraphin), dies at age 91.

March
 March 5: Martin Emond, New Zealand painter, illustrator and comics artist (Accident Man, The Punisher), commits suicide at age 33.
 March 8: Mario Uggeri, Italian painter, sculptor and comics artist, dies at age 70.
 March 11: 
 Ladislaus Elischer, German comics artist (Bummel, Mexycano, Die Spreenixen), dies at age 68 or 69.
 Gilles Nicoulaud, French comics artist, dies at age 61.
 March 30: Doug Tainsh, Australian cartoonist, gag writer, screenwriter and comics artist (Speewah Jack, Cedric), dies at age 82.

April
 April 5: Gébé, French comics artist (L'An 01), passes away from a tumor at age 74.
 April 8: Ernö Zórád, Hungarian comics artist, painter and illustrator, dies at age 93.
 April 10: Chester Commodore, American comics artist (The Sparks, continued Bungleton Green, The Ravings of Professor Doodle, So What?), passes away at age 89. 
 April 11: Irv Novick, American comics artist (DC Comics) artist, passes away at age 93.
 April 14: 
 Harry Holt, American comics artist and animator (Blackeye and Blubber, worked for Merry Go-Round Comics), passes away at age 93.
 Pepe Huinca, Chilean comics artist (Artemio), dies at age 61 in a car accident.
 April 15: Mitsuteru Yokoyama, Japanese manga artist (Tetsujin 28-go, Giant Robo, Sangokushi), passes away at age 69 in a home fire.

May
 May 1: Jørgen Mogensen, Danish comics artist (Alfredo, Poeten og Lillemor, Roselil og hendes mor), passes away at age 82.
 May 11: Aristophane Boulon, aka Aristophane, French comics artist, dies at age 37.
 May 12: Syd Hoff, American cartoonist and comics artist (Tuffy, Laugh It Off), dies at age 91.
 May 15:
 Jack Bradbury, American comics artist (Disney comics, Looney Tunes comics, Walter Lantz comics), passes away at age 89.
 Gill Fox, American comics artist (Side Glances, Wilbert, Bumper to Bumper, Jeanie, Joe Magarar, worked on Hi & Lois), passes away at age 88.
 May 16: Remus Dimitrie Sbiera, aka Sool Sbiera, Romanian comics artist (Les Braconniers), dies at age 67.

June
 June 6: Kate Worley, American comics writer (Omaha the Cat Dancer), dies of cancer at age 46.
 June 7: Karel Biddeloo, Belgian comics artist (continued De Rode Ridder), passes away from cancer at age 60.
 June 17: Todor Dinov, Bulgarian animator and comics artist (Malkoto Anche), dies at age 84.
 June 24: Heinz Rammelt, German comics artist (Der Insel der Ferianer, Chi-Chi), passes away at age 92.

July
 July 2: John Cullen Murphy, American comics artist (Big Ben Bolt, worked on Prince Valiant), dies at age 85.
 July 8: Chlodwig Poth, German comics artist (Amadeus Knüll), dies at age 74.
 July 25: Joe Buresch, American comics artist (Dinah Mite), dies at age 87.
 July 26: Oğuz Aral, Turkish comics artist (Hafiyesi Mahmut, Hayk Mammer, Utanmaz Adam, Avanak Avni), dies at age 68.
 July 28: Eugenio Zoppi, Argentine comics artist (Alain y Crazy, Misterix), dies at age 81.
 Specific date in July unknown: Mario Capaldi, British comics artist and illustrator, dies at age 69.

August
 August 2: François Craenhals, Belgian comics artist (Pom et Teddy, Primus et Musette, Les 4 As, Le Chevalier Ardent), passes away at age 77.
 August 11: George Breisacher, American comics artist (Knobs, continued Mutt and Jeff), dies at age 64. 
 August 26: Enzo Baldoni, Italian journalist and translator of Doonesbury in the Italian magazine Linus, is kidnapped and murdered by terrorists in Iraq at age 55.
 August 30: Bart Huges, Dutch activist and comics writer (Arnold Slak & de Slow Sisters op weg, Licht uit de put, Een wetenschappelijke sekte...? en Gnōthi seauton/Ken uzelf: erken uw oude engrammen ), passes away at age 70.

September
 September 5: Carlos Leopardi, Argentine comics artist (Atila, worked on Nippur de Lagash), dies at age 57.

November
 November 2: Theo van Gogh, Dutch film director and comics writer (wrote comics in collaboration with Eric Schreurs), is murdered at age 47.
 November 6: Lars Hillersberg, Swedish caricaturist and comics artist, dies at age 67.
 November 12: Harry Hargreaves, British comics artist, illustrator and animator (Hayseeds, assisted on Pansy Potter and Panda, the bird in Punch), dies at age 82.
 November 13: Harry Lampert, American comics artist (co-creator of The Flash), dies at age 88.
 November 25: Bob Haney, American comics writer (DC Comics, co-creator of the Teen Titans), dies at c. age 78.
 November 29: Irwin Donenfeld, American comics executive ( National Periodicals (DC Comics)), dies at age 78.

December
 December 3: Hans Nordenström, aka Brul, Swedish cartoonist, illustrator and comics artist, dies at age 77.
 December 22: Loek van Delden, Dutch comics artist (Smidje Verholen, Brigadier Piet), passes away at age 86.
 December 22: Ben van Voorn, Dutch comics artist and animator (worked for Marten Toonder), dies at age 67.
 December 26: Pierre Dupuis, French comics artist (Les Grands Capitaines, La Seconde Guerre Mondiale, worked on L'oncle Paul series, continued Mam'zelle Minouche), dies at age 75.

Specific date unknown
 Dimitris Antonopoulos, Greek architect, painter, illustrator and comics artist (Ta Koróida oi Archaíoi, aka The Ancient Losers), passes away at age 71 or 72.
 Wim Hanssen, Dutch comic artist (comic adaptations of De Molenaar and 1984), dies at age 45.
 Lucien Meys, Belgian comics artist (Le Beau Pays d'Onironie, Chroniques de l'Heureux Zélu) and comics writer (Signor Spaghetti, Modeste et Pompon, Mongwy), dies at age 67 or 68.
 Mehmet Tunali, Turkish painter and comic artist (Alparslan, Amsterdam Underwater), dies at age 48 or 49.

Exhibitions 
 September 15–December 10: "Gillray's Legacy," curated by Lucy Shelton Caswell (8th Festival of Cartoon Art, Philip Sills Gallery, William Oxley Thompson Library, The Ohio State University, Columbus, Ohio)

Conventions 
 January 10–11: Florida Extravaganza (Orange County Convention Center, Orlando, Florida)
 January 31: FLUKE Mini-Comics & Zine Festival (Tasty World, Athens, Georgia)
 February 21–22: Alternative Press Expo (Concourse Exhibition Center, San Francisco)
 February 29: Emerald City ComiCon (Qwest Field, West Field Plaza, Seattle, Washington) — guests: Stan Sakai, J.G. Jones, Howard Chaykin, Dave Johnson, Todd Nauck, Jeff Johnson, Tomm Coker, Stefano Gaudiano, Brian Michael Bendis, Phil Noto, Matt Wagner, Ford Gilmore, Bob Schreck, Kurt Busiek, Jay Faerber, Greg Rucka, Darick Robertson, John Layman, David Hahn, Karl Kesel, Paul Guinan, Matt Haley, Steve Lieber, Dan Norton, Jason Pearson, and Michael T. Gilbert
 February 29: Toronto ComiCON I (Metro Toronto Convention Centre, Toronto, Ontario, Canada)
 March 5–7: MegaCon (Orange County Convention Center, Orlando, Florida) — guests include Kaare Andrews, Brian Michael Bendis, John Cassaday, Amanda Conner, Phil Jimenez, Andy Lee, Tony Lorenz, David W. Mack, James O'Barr, Jimmy Palmiotti, Walter Simonson, Craig Thompson, Skottie Young, Luis Amado, Tony Bedard, Jose Caraballo, Patrick Carlucci, Jim Cheung, Laura DePuy, Chuck Dixon, Steve Epting, Glenda Finkelstein, Jeff Johnson, Greg Land, Ron Marz, Stanley Morrison, Mike Perkins, Brandon Peterson, Justin Ponsor, Ariel Rivero, Tone Rodriguez, Steven Sanchez, Bart Sears, Josh Sullivan, Kevin Smith, Jason Mewes, Allison Mack, Walter Koenig, Ken Foree, Brad Dourif, Noah Hathaway, Herbert Jefferson, Jr., Brian Thompson, Glenn Shadix, Marc Singer, Angela Cartwright, Bill Mumy, Virginia Hey, and Sid Haig
 March 6–7: London Film and Comic Con I (Wembley Exhibition Centre, London, England, UK) — inaugural event
 March 13–14: Chicago ComicFest (Ramada Plaza Hotel O'Hare, Rosemont, Illinois)
 March 20: UK Web & Mini Comix Thing (The Octagon, Queen Mary's College, Stepney, London, UK): the first iteration of this event, organized by Patrick Findlay. Guests included Al Davison, Roger Langridge, and Gary Spencer Millidge
 March 19–21: Wizard World Los Angeles (Long Beach Convention Center, Long Beach, California) — inaugural event; 19,000 attendees; guest of honor Kevin Smith; other guests include Eric Basaldua, Brian Michael Bendis, Alex Ross, Avi Arad, Selma Blair, Guillermo del Toro, James Franco, Gale Anne Hurd, Thomas Jane, Stan Lee, Kevin Nash, Ron Perlman, Rebecca Romijn-Stamos, and Marc Silvestri
 April: Phoenix Comicon (Glendale, Arizona)
 April 1–3: National Comic Book, Art, and Sci-Fi Expo I (Penn Plaza Pavilion, New York City) — guest of honor Jerry Robinson; other guests include Sergio Aragonés, Jim Lee, Mark Bagley, Bill Sienkiewicz, Roy Thomas, Alex Maleev, and Kevin Eastman
 April 3: Small Press and Alternative Comics Expo (S.P.A.C.E.) (Ohio Expo Center, Rhodes Center, Columbus, Ohio) — special guests: Dave Sim and Gerhard. Sim awarded the SPACE Lifetime Achievement Award
 April 16–18: Atlanta Comicon (Gwinnett Civic Center, Gwinnett, Georgia) — 2,000–6,000 attendees
 April 30–May 2: Pittsburgh Comicon (Radisson Hotel Pittsburgh ExpoMart, Monroeville, Pennsylvania) — guests include Jim Rugg, George A. Romero, Lani Tupu, and Virginia Hey
 May 2: Toronto ComiCON Fan Appreciation Event (Metro Toronto Convention Centre, Toronto, Ontario, Canada)
 May 1–2: WonderCon (Moscone Center, San Francisco, California)
 May 14–16: Motor City Comic Con I (Novi Expo Center, Novi, Michigan) — 15th anniversary show; guests include Julie Benz, Erin Gray, Kate Jackson, Ron Perlman, and Alfonso Ribeiro.
 May 15: East Coast Black Age of Comics Convention (Philadelphia, Pennsylvania) — presentation of the ECBACC Pioneer Lifetime Achievement Award
 May 21–23: Wizard World East (Philadelphia Convention Center, Philadelphia, Pennsylvania)
 May 23–24: Comic Festival (Ramada Plaza, Bristol, Avon, England, U.K.) — guests include  Gary Spencer Millidge, Bob Finch, Norman Lovett, John McCrea, Duncan Fegredo, David Roach, Rob Williams, Jon Foster, and Gary Erskine
 June 5–6: Adventure Con 3 (Knoxville Expo Center, Knoxville, Tennessee) — 3,000 attendees
 June 6: Stumptown Comics Fest (Portland, Oregon) — first inaugural event, hosted by the Old Church, a non-profit organization whose goal was to preserve an old church. 22 exhibitor tables, 150 attendees
 June 11–13: Heroes Convention (Charlotte Convention Center, Charlotte, North Carolina) — guests include  Jim Amash, Murphy Anderson, John Beatty, Mark Brooks, Nick Cardy, Richard Case, John Cassaday, Dave Cockrum, Steve Conley, Kim DeMulder, Tommy Lee Edwards, Steve Epting, Matt Feazell, Tom Feister, Ron Garney, Chris Giarrusso, Keron Grant, Cully Hamner, Scott Hampton, Tony Harris, Irwin Hasen, Sam Henderson, Adam Hughes, Georges Jeanty, Dan Jolley, Nat Jones, Jim Krueger, Dick Kulpa, Jason Latour, Rick Leonardi, Joseph Michael Linsner, Aaron Lopresti, David W. Mack, Ed McGuinness,  Joshua Middleton, Martin Nodell, Phil Noto, Michael Avon Oeming, Jeff Parker, Jason Pearson, Brandon Peterson, Paul Pope, Howard Porter, Eric Powell, George Pratt, James Pruett, Joe Pruett, Budd Root, Josef Rubinstein, Paul Ryan, David Self, Bill Sienkiewicz, Joe Sinnott, Joe Staton, Brian Stelfreeze, Karl Story, Roy Thomas, Tim Townsend, Robert Ullman, Dexter Vines, Neil Vokes, Loston Wallace, Mike Wieringo, and Larry Young
 June 18–20: Toronto Comic Con (National Trade Centre, Queen Elizabeth Building, Toronto, Ontario, Canada) — guests of honor: Will Eisner and Dave Sim
 June 26–27: MoCCA Festival (Puck Building, New York City)
 July 22–25: Comic-Con International (San Diego Convention Center, San Diego, California) — 95,000 attendees; official guests:  Jack Adler, Roger Dean, Dave Gibbons, Tom Gill, Harry Harrison, Sid Jacobson, Geoff Johns, Batton Lash, Chuck McCann, Aaron McGruder, Brad Meltzer, Mike Mignola, Rebecca Moesta, Bill Plympton, Eduardo Risso, Jean Schulz, Frank Springer, Tim Thomerson, Craig Thompson, and John Totleben. Comic-Con expands into Hall H of the San Diego Convention Center and now occupies the entire exhibit space.
 August 8: National Comic Book, Art, and Sci-Fi Expo II (Penn Plaza Pavilion, New York City)
 August 13–15: Wizard World Chicago (Rosemont Convention Center, Rosemont, Illinois) — guest of honor: Joss Whedon; special guests: Kelly Hu and Amber Benson; other guests: Brian Michael Bendis, Josh Blaylock, J. Scott Campbell, John Cassaday, Jim Cheung, Marie Croall, Tony Daniel, Lou Ferrigno, Gene Ha, Greg Horn, Geoff Johns, Dan Jolley, Jim Lee, Jeph Loeb, Sean McKeever, Angel Medina, Mark Millar, Mike Norton, Joe Quesada, Alex Ross, Alex Saviuk, Marc Silvestri, Kevin Smith, Michael Turner, Brian K. Vaughn, and Skottie Young
 August 14–15: "CAPTION is History" (Wolfson College, Oxford, England) — guests include Al Davison and Pat Mills
 August 27–29: Fan Expo Canada (Metro Toronto Convention Centre, Toronto, Ontario, Canada) — 27,684 attendees; guests include George Takei, Julie Benz, Peter Mayhew, Mercedes McNab, Anthony Montgomery, Aron Eisenberg, Cirroc Lofton, George A. Romero, Tom Savini, Alejandro Jodorowsky, Doug Bradley, Yoshitoshi ABe, Yasuyuki Ueda, George Pérez, Brian Azzarello, Mike Deodato, Rags Morales, Skottie Young, Adam Hughes, David W. Mack, and Jill Thompson
 September 3–6: Dragon Con (Hyatt Regency Atlanta/Marriott Marquis, Atlanta, Georgia) — 20,000+ attendees
 September 18–19: National Comic Book, Art, and Sci-Fi Expo III (Penn Plaza Pavilion, New York City) — guests include Jim Steranko, Sal Buscema, Glen Fabry, Los Bros Hernandez, and Angel Medina
 September 23: Comics Salon (Pezinok, Slovakia)
 October 2–3: Small Press Expo (Bethesda, Maryland)
 October 16–17: Motor City Comic Con II (Novi Expo Center, Novi, Michigan)— guests include Dan Mishkin, Rowena Morrill, Bill Morrison, Stephanie Murnane, Eddy Newell, Diana Okamoto, Mike Okamoto, Mike Pascale, Scott Rosema, Steve Rude, Stan Sakai, Paul Sizer, Layne Toth, Daniel Webb, Bill Wilkinson, and Randy Zimmerman
 October 23: London Comic Festival (Holiday Inn London Bloomsbury, London, England, U.K.) — guests include Gary Spencer Millidge
 October 23–24: Dallas Comic Con (Plano Centre, Plano, Texas) — guests include Adam Hughes, Michael Lark, Greg Horn, Dan Brereton, Cal Slayton, and Michael Jantze
 November 5–7: Wizard World Texas (Arlington Convention Center, Dallas, Texas) — guests include Jim Lee, Brian Pulido, Marc Silvestri, Michael Turner, Mark Waid, and Skottie Young
 November 6–7: Comic Expo (Ramada City Inn, Bristol, United Kingdom) — first iteration of this annual convention; guests include Simon Furman, Mike Carey, and Mike Collins
 November 6–7: London Film and Comic Con II (Wembley Exhibition Centre, London, England, UK)
 November 27–28: Mid-Ohio Con (Columbus Hilton Easton, Columbus, Ohio) — guests include Sergio Aragonés, John Byrne, Talent Caldwell, Stan Goldberg, Marc Hempel, David Mack, Michael Avon Oeming, Jeff Smith, and Tom Batiuk

First issues by title

DC Comics 
JSA Strange Adventures
Release: October.

Marvel Comics 
Guardians
Release: July 14. Writer: Marc Sumerak. Artist: Casey Jones.LokiRelease: July 7. Writer: Robert Rodi. Artist: Esad Ribić.Man-ThingRelease: July 21. Writer: Hans Rodionoff. Artist: Kyle Hotz.Official Handbook of the Marvel Universe: Avengers 2004Release: July 7. Cover by: Salvador Larroca.StarjammersRelease: July 7.Writer: Kevin J. Anderson. Artist: Francisco Ruiz Velasco.WitchesRelease: June. Writer: Brian Walsh. Artist: Will Conrad.

 Other publishers Capitão BrasilOsiedle Swoboda Release: June by Niezależna Prasa. Writer & Artist:'' Michał Śledziński

Initial appearances by character name

Footnotes